Sayyid Hadi Abdulrahman al-Mahdi (1918–1971) was a Sudanese political and religious figure. He was a leader of the Sudanese Ansar religious order and was also the uncle of fellow Umma party politician Sadiq al-Mahdi. The Umma party was largely torn in half between 1966 and 1969 as a result of a split between Hadi al-Mahdi and Sadiq al-Mahdi.

Mahdi died in 1971 whilst attempting to escape from Sudan to Ethiopia following the bombing of Aba Island by Gaafar Nimeiry.

References

1918 births
1970 deaths
National Umma Party politicians
Al-Mahdi family